is a Japanese former footballer.

Career statistics

Club

Notes

References

1994 births
Living people
Association football people from Aichi Prefecture
Japanese footballers
Japanese expatriate footballers
Association football defenders
Singapore Premier League players
Japan Soccer College players
Albirex Niigata Singapore FC players
Iwaki FC players
Arterivo Wakayama players
Japanese expatriate sportspeople in Singapore
Expatriate footballers in Singapore
Japanese expatriate sportspeople in Austria
Expatriate footballers in Austria
Japanese expatriate sportspeople in Taiwan
Expatriate footballers in Taiwan